Are a Drag is the second album by Me First and the Gimme Gimmes, released in 1999 on the Fat Wreck Chords independent record label.

The album is made up mainly of show tunes. The album's title alludes to the fact that most of the songs on the album feature vocalist Spike Slawson singing songs that were originally performed by female characters in their original stage shows/movies (with the exception of the Phantom's part in "Phantom of the Opera", "Science Fiction/Double Feature" which was sung by a female traditionally, but more popularly by Richard O'Brien in The Rocky Horror Picture Show, and "Rainbow Connection").

The album's cover features the members of the band dressed up, in drag, as five characters from the musicals represented in song: a member of A Chorus Line ("What I Did For Love"), Annie Mudge from Annie ("Tomorrow"), Dorothy Gale from The Wizard of Oz ("Over the Rainbow"), Sandy Dumbrowski from Grease ("It's Raining on Prom Night"), and Dr. Frank-N-Furter  from The Rocky Horror Show ("Science Fiction/Double Feature").

Like many other Gimme Gimmes albums, Are a Drag contains many elements of mash-up - more specifically, musical allusions to punk or power-pop songs in their covers. The intro to the song "My Favorite Things" quotes "Generator", by Bad Religion, and at the end of "Tomorrow", Fat Mike can be heard singing "Mommy's alright, daddy's alright, they just seem a little weird" - a lyric from "Surrender" by Cheap Trick.

Track listing

Personnel
 Spike Slawson - vocals
 Chris Shiflett (a.k.a. Jake Jackson) - lead guitar
 Joey Cape - rhythm guitar
 Fat Mike - bass
 Dave Raun - drums

Additional musicians
 Karina Denike - backing vocals
 Sara K. Fisher - backing vocals

References 

1999 albums
Me First and the Gimme Gimmes albums
Fat Wreck Chords albums
Albums produced by Ryan Greene